Living 100 MPH is a Canadian comedy-drama film, directed by Louis Bélanger and released in 2019. A semi-autobiographical film, it centres on the coming-of-age of three friends, Louis, Daniel and Éric, from their early teens in the late 1970s, when they begin dealing drugs in their school, through to their young adulthood in the 1990s, when Louis discovers his passion and talent for photography.

Louis is portrayed by Matt Hébert as a child, Elijah Patrice-Baudelot as a teenager and Rémi Goulet as a young adult; Daniel is portrayed by Nicolas Guay as a child, Zakary Methot as a teenager and Antoine L'Écuyer as an adult; Éric, who first appears as a teenager, is portrayed by Dylan Walsh as a teenager and Félix-Antoine Cantin as an adult.

The film premiered at the Angoulême Film Festival in August 2019. It had its Canadian premiere in September at the Quebec City Film Festival, where it won the Prix du Public, before opening commercially on September 27.

References

External links

2019 films
2019 drama films
Canadian coming-of-age comedy-drama films
Films directed by Louis Bélanger
Films shot in Quebec
Films set in Quebec City
French-language Canadian films
2010s Canadian films